The R104 road is a regional road in north Dublin, Ireland.  The road passes through Finglas, Santry, and Coolock, along the northern edge of Raheny and finishes at the coast in Kilbarrack.

The official description of the R104 from the Roads Act 1993 (Classification of Regional Roads) Order 2012  reads:

R104: Finglas - Kilbarrack, Dublin

 Between its junction with R135 at North Road Finglas in the city of Dublin and its junction with R132 at Swords Road in the city of Dublin via Saint Margarets Road in the city of Dublin: Saint Margarets Road in the county of Fingal: and Santry Avenue in the city of Dublin

and

between its junction with R132 at Swords Road in the city of Dublin and its junction with R105 at Dublin Road Kilbarrack in the city of Dublin via Coolock Lane, Oscar Traynor Road, Tonlegee Road and Kilbarrack Road in the city of Dublin: and Kilbarrack Road in the county of Fingal.

See also
Roads in Ireland
National primary road
National secondary road
Regional road

References

Regional roads in the Republic of Ireland
Roads in County Dublin
Roads in Dublin (city)